Abdulhadi Khamis (born 19 December 1990) is a Kuwaiti footballer who plays as a forward for the Kuwaiti Premier League club Al-Salmiya.

International goals
Scores and results list Kuwait's goal tally first.

References

External links

1990 births
Living people
Kuwaiti footballers
Kuwait international footballers
Association football forwards
Kuwait SC players
Footballers at the 2010 Asian Games
Sportspeople from Kuwait City
Asian Games competitors for Kuwait
AFC Cup winning players
Al-Fahaheel FC players
Al-Shabab SC (Kuwait) players
Kuwait Premier League players
Al Salmiya SC players